Kinkaid is a populated place located in Mineral County.
Kinkaid is also known as Kinkead and Kinkaid Siding.  Kinkead was a stop on the Carson and Colorado Railway.  Kinkead Mill, located in Kinkead, was in operation in the 1940s.

References

External links
  - includes photos.

Ghost towns in Mineral County, Nevada